Cordaro Uveil Stewart (born September 18, 1990)  better known by his stage names Mr. Cash King and C. Stewart, is an American Rapper from Detroit, Michigan. On December 10, 2015 he released his first independent recording Single (music), "Inspiration" it was one of the top 11 songs and first in the rap Music genre at the fourth annual GRAMMY Amplifier program with Big Sean, Sam Hunt, and Lzzy Hale being the curator judges. His second single, "Round Hea" Featuring Atlantic Records recording artist Dusty McFly was released in 2016 as a trap heavy song.

Discography

Singles

References

External links 

 Official Website
 

1990 births
Living people
African-American male rappers
People from Detroit
Rappers from Detroit
Musicians from Michigan
21st-century American rappers
21st-century American male musicians
21st-century African-American musicians